Meteor Garden may refer to:
 Meteor Garden (2001 TV series), Taiwanese TV adaptation of Japanese shōjo manga series Boys Over Flowers
 Meteor Garden II, 2002 sequel of the Taiwanese series
 Meteor Garden (2018 TV series), mainland Chinese remake

See also
Meteor Rain, spin-off miniseries of the 2001 series.
Boys Over Flowers (disambiguation)